Selassie Lake is a lake in Thunder Bay District, Ontario, Canada, and the source of the Whitesand River which flows into Lake Nipigon. Selassie Lake is adjacent to Haile Lake, which also flows into Lake Nipigon, but via the Pikitigushi River system. The names of the two lakes are a reference to Haile Selassie I of Ethiopia.

References

Lakes of Thunder Bay District
Haile Selassie